This is a list of current honorary Knights and Dames of the Order of the British Empire.

Honorary Knights and Dames Grand Cross

Honorary Knights and Dames Commander 

Military ranks listed denotes the awarded being in the military division.

References

current